Susy Kane (born 27 August 1978, in Dorking, Surrey, England) is an English actress, comedy writer and musician.

Personal life
She is the daughter of opera singer Alison Warner and actor and writer John Kane, and the younger sister of comedy writer and actor Simon Kane. Her father is a former associate artist of the Royal Shakespeare Company and is the creator and writer of British sitcom Terry and June. She is of French Huguenot and Celtic ancestry.

She grew up in Wandsworth, London and won a scholarship to Westminster School in the sixth form. She studied Chinese, Art and Film at the University of Edinburgh. She lives in London and Los Angeles.

Career

A singer, jazz pianist and classically trained violinist she started singing in jazz clubs when she was 16. She has written event music for the London Eye and played gypsy fiddle for the Charlotte Church album Tissues and Issues.

She was also a leading contributor to Funny Or Die UK as a writer, actress and director. On radio she plays Pippa in the long running and award-winning comedy series Bleak Expectations on BBC Radio 4 and Andrée Melly in the BBC's award-winning recreation of the missing episodes of Hancock's Half Hour.

In 2012 she joined the cast of "Nickelodeon"'s "House of Anubis" for its third season as Caroline Denby. In 2018 she played Cynthia in the feature film Stan and Ollie with Steve Coogan and John C. Reilly.

In 2018 she narrated the Channel 4 Documentary "The Million Pound Holiday Club".

In 2019 she joined the cast of cult US TV show Lodge 49 playing Lamar's (Paul Giamatti) French muse Genevieve. In season 2 episode 9 she sings a French mariachi version of "The Impossible Dream". Her acapella version of Eden Ahbez's "Nature Boy" was also used in season 1 episode 6, and appears on the Lodge 49 Soundtrack album, which was released in December 2019.

Also in 2019 she starred in Comedy Central comedy pilot "Chasers" as Samantha Darling, opposite Rob Huebel, Matt Walsh, Gaten Matarazzo, and Cathy Shim.

She has written sketches for topical BBC radio sketch show Recorded For Training Purposes, BBC Comedy Shuffle, ITV's Comedy Cuts, BBC Three's Rose D'Or winning CGI sketch show The Wrong Door and BAFTA award winning series Harry and Paul starring Harry Enfield and Paul Whitehouse, also for the BBC. Her pilot script "Jurgatory" based on her time doing jury service sold to FX Channel in the US in 2014.

Television

Radio
It Is Rocket Science
Bleak Expectations
Bullet at Balmains
Recorded For Training Purposes
The Missing Hancocks

Film
Bill (2015)
Resurrecting Bill
Stan & Ollie (2018)

References

Current CV
Current CV

External links

 Agent's web site

English television actresses
English television writers
English women comedians
1978 births
Living people
People from Dorking
People educated at Westminster School, London
Alumni of the University of Edinburgh
English radio actresses
British women television writers